Sasha Palatnikov (born March 15, 1989) is a Hong Kong-born Russian mixed martial artist who competed in the Welterweight division of the Ultimate Fighting Championship.

Background

Palatnikov, the son of a Russian father, who was a professional high diver, and a Scottish mother, was born and raised in Hong Kong but spent many summers in Brooklyn as a kid, specifically Brighton Beach. Due to this, he has a conversational level of knowledge in Cantonese. His parents put him in Karate at the age of five. He started playing rugby at the age of six and would train Muay Thai and boxing in the off seasons. He played rugby professionally, but due to an injury, decided to retire and go pursue an education.

Sasha was the Hong Kong Heavyweight Amateur Boxing Association Champion in 2012, wanting to represent Hong Kong at Olympic qualifiers but due to politics and the fact that he was not ethnically Chinese, he was prohibited from doing so.

Sasha also spent time in the United States and Canada throughout his college career, studying and playing football and rugby at Concordia University, Hudson Valley Community College, and the University of Buffalo, graduating with a communications degree and minored in computer science. During this time he also obtained a US citizenship from his time studying.

In 2014, Palatnikov was sentenced to a 2-year prison sentence by the Hong Kong District Court for a robbery in 2013. The incident occurred when Sasha was helping a South African citizen recover a HK$10,000 debt from an Australian man. HK$70,000 in cash was stolen after the pair forced their way into his flat. At the time, Sasha was a computer programmer who was described as "a straight-A student" and excellent rugby player, claimed he had agreed to help his friend in what he thought would be a purely verbal confrontation with the Australian. Dawson, the Australian, was kicked and punched by the South African while being held by Palatnikov, the court heard. After serving 16 months, Palatnikov was released in 2015.

Within a month of his release, Palatnikov went to the Philippines to compete in a jiu-jitsu competition, then moved to Florida to train at the Blackzilians team gym in Boca Raton.

Mixed martial arts career

Early career

After making his debut in 2017, losing to Emmanuel Verdier via TKO in the second round at Fight Time 36, in 2018, he returned to Hong Kong with his girlfriend, initially just for two weeks on holiday to get his permanent ID renewed. A friend put him in touch with local promotion Just MMA, who asked if he wanted to fight on their upcoming card. He won the bout via knockout in the second round and his opponents manager became his manager as well.

After a one off unanimous decision win against Jeremy Bastian at Combat FC 1 in China, Sasha joined the Angel Fight Championship, where he won his first bout against Jae Young Ahn at AFC 10 on January 28, 2019, via unanimous decision. He then moved up to Middleweight for his next bout in the promotion, winning the AFC Middleweight Championship against Sun Won Son at AFC 12. In the process, Palatnikov became the first Hong Kong-born MMA champion.

Sasha then fought for the UAE Warriors promotion, where he faced fellow future UFC fighter, Mounir Lazzez at UAE Warriors 8. He lost the bout via TKO at the end of the first round.

Palatnikov faced late replacement Paulo Henrique at UAE Warriors 13 in a catchweight bout, winning the bout in the first round.

Ultimate Fighting Championship
Palatnikov made his promotion debut against Louis Cosce on November 21, 2020, at UFC 255. He won the bout via TKO in the third round. This fight earned him the Fight of the Night awards.

In his sophomore appearance in the organization, Palatnikov faced Impa Kasanganay on April 10, 2021, at UFC on ABC: Vettori vs. Holland. He lost the fight via second-round submission.

Palatnikov faced Ramiz Brahimaj on August 21, 2021, at UFC on ESPN: Cannonier vs. Gastelum. He lost the fight via technical submission due to a rear naked choke in round one.

On February 10, 2022, it was announced that Palatnikov was released by UFC.

Post UFC 
Palatnikov faced Kyron Bowen on April 2, 2022 at XMMA 4. He won the bout via TKO stoppage due to punches and elbows.

Palatnikov faced Joshua Jones on May 20, 2022 at Tuff-N-Uff 128. He won the bout via split decision.

Palatnikov faced Tanner Saraceno at XMMA 5 on July 23, 2022. He lost the bout via rear-naked choke in the third round.

Palatnikov signed with Karate Combat on December 17th, winning his debut against Canadian Rob Buxton by knockout in the first round.

Championships and accomplishments

Mixed martial arts 
Ultimate Fighting Championship 
 Fight of the Night (One Time) 
 Angel's Fighting Championship
 AFC Middleweight Championship (One time)

Mixed martial arts record

|-
| Loss 
| align=center| 8–5
| Tanner Saraceno
| Submission (rear-naked choke)
| XMMA 5
| 
| align=center|3
| align=center|4:08
| Columbia, South Carolina, United States
|
|-
| Win
| align=center| 8–4
| Joshua Jones
| Decision (split)
| Tuff-N-Uff 128
| 
| align=center|3
| align=center|5:00
| Las Vegas, Nevada, United States
|
|-
| Win 
| align=center| 7–4
| Kyron Bowen
| TKO (punches and elbows)
| XMMA 4
| 
| align=center|1
| align=center|4:03
| New Orleans, Louisiana, United States
|
|-
| Loss
| align=center|6–4
| Ramiz Brahimaj
| Technical Submission (rear-naked choke)
| UFC on ESPN: Cannonier vs. Gastelum
| 
| align=center|1
| align=center|2:33
| Las Vegas, Nevada, United States
|
|-
|Loss
|align=center|6–3
|Impa Kasanganay
|Submission (rear-naked choke)
|UFC on ABC: Vettori vs. Holland
|
|align=center|2
|align=center|0:26
|Las Vegas, Nevada, United States
|
|-
| Win
| align=center| 6–2
| Louis Cosce
| TKO (punches)
| UFC 255
| 
| align=center|3
| align=center|2:27
| Las Vegas, Nevada, United States
| 
|-
| Win
| align=center| 5–2
| Paulo Henrique
| TKO (punches)
| UAE Warriors 13
| 
| align=center| 1
| align=center| 1:23
| Abu Dhabi, United Arab Emirates
| 
|-
| Loss
| align=center|4–2
|Mounir Lazzez
|TKO (elbows and punches)
|UAE Warriors 8
||
|align=center|1
|align=center|4:48
|Abu Dhabi, United Arab Emirates
|
|-
| Win
| align=center|4–1
|Sung Won Son
|Decision (unanimous)
|AFC 12
|
|align=center|5
|align=center|5:00
|Seoul, South Korea
|
|-
| Win
| align=center| 3–1
| Jae Young Ahn
|Decision (unanimous)
|AFC 10
|
|align=center|2
|align=center|5:00
|Seoul, South Korea
|
|-
| Win
| align=center|2–1
| Jeremy Bastian
|Decision (unanimous)
| Combat FC 1: Inception
|
| align=center|3
| align=center|5:00
|Dingcheng, China
|
|-
| Win
| align=center| 1–1
| Seok Hyun Ko
| KO (punch)
|Just MMA 3
|
| align=center|2
| align=center|1:22
|Wan Chai, Hong Kong
|
|-
| Loss
| align=center|0–1
| Emmanuel Verdier
| TKO
|Fight Time 36
|
|align=center|2
|align=center|4:40
|Fort Lauderdale, Florida, United States
|

See also 

 List of male mixed martial artists

References

External links 
  
 

1989 births
Living people
Hong Kong male mixed martial artists
Welterweight mixed martial artists
Mixed martial artists utilizing boxing
Mixed martial artists utilizing karate
Mixed martial artists utilizing Muay Thai
Mixed martial artists utilizing Brazilian jiu-jitsu
Hong Kong male boxers
Hong Kong practitioners of Brazilian jiu-jitsu
Hong Kong male karateka
Hong Kong Muay Thai practitioners
Ultimate Fighting Championship male fighters
Hong Kong people of Russian descent
Hong Kong people of Scottish descent